The 1966–67 DDR-Oberliga was the 18th season of the DDR-Oberliga, the first tier of league football in East Germany.

The league was contested by fourteen teams. FC Karl-Marx-Stadt won the championship, the club's sole national East German championship, being a separate club from SC Wismut Karl-Marx-Stadt, a club that won three championships in the 1950s.

Hartmut Rentzsch of BSG Motor Zwickau was the league's top scorer with 17 goals, while Dieter Erler of FC Karl-Marx-Stadt won the seasons East German Footballer of the year award.

On the strength of the 1966–67 title Karl-Marx-Stadt qualified for the 1967–68 European Cup where the club was knocked out by R.S.C. Anderlecht in the first round. Third-placed club BSG Motor Zwickau qualified for the 1967–68 European Cup Winners' Cup as the seasons FDGB-Pokal winner and was knocked out by FC Torpedo Moscow in the first round. Second-placed 1. FC Lokomotive Leipzig qualified for the 1967–68 Inter-Cities Fairs Cup where it was knocked out in the second round by FK Vojvodina while fourth-placed Dynamo Dresden was knocked out by Rangers F.C. in the first round.

Table									
The 1966–67 season saw two newly promoted clubs, 1. FC Union Berlin and BSG Wismut Gera.

Results

References

Sources

External links
 Das Deutsche Fussball Archiv  Historic German league tables

1966-67 
1
Ober